Blanche Rock is a 0.07 ha dolerite islet in south-eastern Australia.  It is part of the Actaeon Island Group, lying close to the south-eastern coast of Tasmania, at the southern entrance to the D'Entrecasteaux Channel between Bruny Island and the mainland.  It is part of the South Bruny National Park.

Fauna
Recorded breeding seabird and wader species are the Pacific gull, sooty oystercatcher and black-faced cormorant.

References

Islands of Tasmania
Protected areas of Tasmania
South Bruny National Park